The PalaLeonessa (originally the PalaEIB) is an indoor sports arena that is located in Brescia, Italy. The arena has a seating capacity of 5,200 and is primarily used for basketball. The venue is the home ground of the Italian League professional basketball team Germani Basket Brescia.

On 18 June 2018 the new logo of the arena was revealed at Brescia City Hall with the Mayor of the city, Emilio Del Bono, and Graziella Bragaglio, president of the club.

Sports
The arena hosted the 2018 Italian Basketball Supercup on 29 and 30 September 2018.

Since September 2018 the PalaLeonessa has been home arena for the basketball club Germani Basket Brescia in LBA and EuroCup matches.

See also
 List of indoor arenas
 List of basketball arenas

References

External links

Basketball venues in Italy
Indoor arenas in Italy
Sports venues in Italy
Sports venues completed in 2018
2018 establishments in Italy